St Leonard's Church, Scarcliffe, is a  Grade II* listed parish church in the Church of England in Scarcliffe, Derbyshire.

History

The church dates from the 12th century. The tower was rebuilt in 1842 and there was a restoration later in the 19th century.

Parish status
The church is in a joint parish with
St Andrew's Church, Glapwell
St John the Baptist's Church, Ault Hucknall
St Luke's Church, Palterton

Memorials
Constantia de Frecheville (d. 1175)

Organ

The pipe organ was installed by Albert Keates dating from 1908. A specification of the organ can be found on the National Pipe Organ Register.

See also
Grade II* listed buildings in Bolsover (district)
Listed buildings in Scarcliffe

References

Church of England church buildings in Derbyshire
Grade II* listed churches in Derbyshire